Kwetsang Rinpoche was a lama of Sera who participated in the search for Tenzin Gyatso four years after Thubten Gyatso died.

See also 
 Keutsang Hermitage

Lamas
Rinpoches
Tibetan Buddhists from Tibet